Amour Anarchie (English: Anarchy Love) is a double album by Léo Ferré, released in 1970 by Barclay Records. With this album, heavily influenced by sexual revolution and considered by critics as one of his finest, containing a whole string of his classics (like Avec le temps, La Mémoire et la Mer, Le Chien, Poète, vos papiers ! ... ), the singer-songwriter begins to blend singing with dynamic spoken word. In 2010, the French edition of Rolling Stone magazine named this album the 24th greatest French rock album (out of 100).

History
After he had sung in Canada in 1969, Léo Ferré, who was interested in rock music, briefly went to New York City to find the right sound for his "new language", used in his insurrectionary poem Le Chien. Initially, a studio session was intended with Jimi Hendrix, who cancelled, being ill. Ferré recorded with John McLaughlin and Billy Cobham, guitarist and drummer of Mahavishnu Orchestra, and Miroslav Vitous, bassist of Weather Report. For some reason, Ferré didn't use this version and re-recorded the track with Zoo, a young French band recently signed on his record label Barclay, going more destructured (irregular beat). In this manifesto song Ferré powerfully uses spoken word to claim his difference and reject societal hypocrisy.

He sets to music several poems from his book Poète... vos papiers ! (songs Poète, vos papiers !, Les Passantes, Psaume 151, Le Crachat), that critics would praise as a truly renewal of his inspiration, without noticing these texts had been mostly written in the early 50s.

Most of the "new" material is love songs, most of the time straightforward eroticized, except for Avec le temps (As time goes by), a tragic and beautifully sad love song inspired by his own disenchantment and the failure of his relationship with his second wife. It was dismissed from the original LP by his record label and was released on 45s one year later (it is included in the album since CD editions). This instant-classic is the most well-known of Ferré's favorites, becoming with years the most constantly covered French song in France and worldwide. It topped a ranking established in 2012 by 276 contemporary French singers and musicians (and 69 critics) of the best French songs ever.

Track listing

Bonus tracks :

Personnel 
 Zoo (tracks 1 and 5 on disk one):
 André Hervé – organ, piano
 Pierre Fanen – electric guitar
 Michel Ripoche – trombone, tenor saxophone, electric violin
 Daniel Carlet – saxophones, flute, electric violin
 Michel Hervé – bass
 Christian Devaux – drums
 Lionel Gali – violin (uncredited)
 Danielle Licari – vocals (uncredited)
 The orchestra consists of session musicians hired for the recording.

Production 
 Arranger & conductor: Jean-Michel Defaye
 Engineering: Gerhard Lehner, Claude Achallé (tracks 1 and 5, disk one)
 Executive producer: Richard Marsan

References

External links 
 English translation of Écoute-moi
 English translation of La Mémoire et la Mer, Petite, Cette blessure and Avec le temps.

Léo Ferré albums
French-language albums
Barclay (record label) albums
1970 albums